The Texas Department of Motor Vehicles (TxDMV) is a state agency of Texas, headquartered in Austin. The agency handles vehicle registration and titling, authorizes operating authorities of motor carriers, and gives grants to law enforcement agencies to increase public awareness about automobile theft and to reduce automobile theft.

During the 81st session of the Texas Legislature, Governor of Texas Rick Perry signed House Bill 3097 into law in June 2009, authorizing the creation of the agency. The agency began operations in November of that year, taking some functions previously held by the Texas Department of Transportation.

References

External links

 Texas Department of Motor Vehicles

State agencies of Texas
Motor vehicle registration agencies